Paul Matthew Roger Havell (born 4 July 1980) is an Australian-born English cricketer. He is a left-handed batsman and a right-arm fast-medium bowler.

Havell began playing for Sussex in the Second XI Championship in 1999. He made his first-class cricket debut in 2001 for Sussex. He signed for Derbyshire in 2003, playing his first match for his new club in a first-class fixture against a South African touring side in August 2003. A promising first-class debut saw him claim 4 wickets in the first innings. Havell appeared in 3 County Championship games that season.

Havell appeared in 16 first-class matches, taking 41 wickets at an average of 41.78 with a County Championship best figures of 4–75 against Durham at the Riverside in 2004.

References

External links
 Paul Havell at Cricket Archive

1980 births
Australian cricketers
Living people
Sussex cricketers
Derbyshire cricketers
Cricketers from Melbourne